Robert Alfred Adcock (3 November 1916 – 18 March 2005) was an English first-class cricketer. He was a right-handed batsman and a right-arm medium-pace bowler who played first-class cricket for Leicestershire in 1938. He was born in Ibstock and died in Leicester.

Adcock played for just one County Championship season, making his debut against Warwickshire in a rain-interrupted draw. Adcock played four further matches during the 1938 season, and was never on the winning side in a County Championship game. Three of the five first-class games in which Adcock participated were lost by an innings margin. Adcock was a lower-middle order batsman.

Adcock bowled just ten overs in his first-class career, and the following year, played in the Minor Counties Championship for Lincolnshire. He died at the age of 88.

1916 births
2005 deaths
English cricketers
Leicestershire cricketers
People from Ibstock
Cricketers from Leicestershire
Lincolnshire cricketers